Georgios Papadopoulos (1914 – ?) was a Greek professional footballer who played as a left back.

Club career

Papadopoulos started football at PAOK in 1930 and four years later he came to Athens on behalf of AEK Athens, where he played until 1948, where he retired from football. He played alongside players such as Kleanthis Maropoulos, Michalis Delavinias, Christos Ribas, Vasilios Manettas, Tryfon Tzanetis and Georgios Magiras, while he won 2 conscecutive Panhellenic Championships, 3 Greek Cups and 4 Athens FCA League, including the first domestic double by a Greek club in 1939.

International career
He played a total of 9 times with the Greece, between 1934 and 1940.  His debut took place on 23 December 1934 in a home win against Yugoslavia of the fourth Balkan Cup, under the instructions of Apostolos Nikolaidis. He was also part of Greece's team for their qualification matches for the 1938 FIFA World Cup.

Honours

AEK Athens
Panhellenic Championship: 1938–39, 1939–40
Greek Cup: 1938–39
Athens FCA League: 1940, 1946, 1947

References

External links

1914 births
Year of death missing
Greek footballers
Greece international footballers
PAOK FC players
AEK Athens F.C. players
Association football defenders
People from the Marmara Region